Fool on the Planet is a greatest hits album released by The Pillows on February 7, 2001. It features two new songs, "Fool on the Planet" and the hidden track "Secret Slogan".

Track listing

2001 greatest hits albums
The Pillows compilation albums